Highbush Peak is a  elevation mountain summit located in the Chugach Mountains, in Anchorage Municipality in the U.S. state of Alaska. Precipitation runoff from the peak drains into Turnagain Arm. This mountain's unofficial name refers to the highbush cranberry. Other berry-theme peaks nearby include Lowbush Peak, Lingon Mountain, Nagoon Mountain, Blueberry Hill, and Bearberry Point.

Climate

Based on the Köppen climate classification, Highbush Peak is located in a subarctic climate zone with long, cold, snowy winters, and mild summers. Temperatures can drop below −20 °C with wind chill factors below −30 °C. This climate supports a small unnamed glacier on its east slope.

See also

List of mountain peaks of Alaska
Geology of Alaska

References

External links

 Highbush Peak weather forecast

North American 1000 m summits
Mountains of Alaska
Mountains of Anchorage, Alaska